Hammersmith Hospital, formerly the Military Orthopaedic Hospital, and later the Special Surgical Hospital, is a major teaching hospital in White City, West London. It is part of Imperial College Healthcare NHS Trust in the London Borough of Hammersmith and Fulham, and is associated with the Imperial College Faculty of Medicine. Confusingly the hospital is not in Hammersmith but is located in White City adjacent to Wormwood Scrubs and East Acton.

History

Origins

The hospital's origins begin in 1902, when the Hammersmith Poor Law Guardians decided to erect a new workhouse and infirmary on a  site at the north side of Du Cane Road somewhat to the north of Shepherd's Bush. The land, adjacent to Wormwood Scrubs Prison, was purchased for £14,500 from the Ecclesiastical Commissioners. A temporary corrugated iron building was erected on the site in 1902 to provide care for victims of a smallpox epidemic that had taken place in the winter of 1901–2. The buildings were designed by the firm of Giles, Gough and Trollope.

World War I
In February 1916, during the First World War, the patients were moved to other establishments and the site was taken over by the War Office for use as the Military Orthopaedic Hospital, to care for wounded soldiers, largely thanks to the efforts of the noted surgeon Robert Jones. At that time the Joint War Committee awarded the hospital the sum of £1,000 to begin its work, soon followed in 1918 by a further grant of £10,000. The hospital was also supported by donations from the public. Part of the rehabilitation process involved putting the recovering patients to work in local shops, a policy which does not appear to have been entirely popular among the soldiers themselves.

Inter-war era
Later it was renamed the Special Surgical Hospital, and in 1919 became the Ministry of Pensions Hospital. In April 1925 demands by the Hammersmith Guardians for return of their property finally succeeded and the site became Hammersmith Hospital. By 1930, the infirmary could accommodate 300 patients.

World War II
During the Second World War the hospital amassed expertise on the effects of crush syndrome and kidney failure as a result of treating air raid victims. The hospital refectory was completely destroyed during one air raid. Roger Daltrey, the singer and actor, was born at the hospital in 1944.

The hospital was home to the first medical linear accelerator in the world at the MRC's Radiotherapeutic Research Unit, where the first patient was treated in 1953. The Commonwealth Building, which included the postgraduate medical school, the Wellcome Library and some research departments, was opened by the Queen in May 1966.

Modern era
Until 1997 the hospital was the home of the Royal Postgraduate Medical School, which then became part of Imperial College. The Institute of Reproductive and Developmental Biology (IRDB) was established by Professor Lord Winston on the site in 2001. In October 2007 Imperial College Healthcare and Imperial College formed the first academic health science centre from resources that included the academic expertise of Hammersmith Hospital and St Mary's Hospital.

Facilities

Hammersmith Hospital is internationally renowned for clinical research. Its clinical reputation was built on the treatment of medical conditions notably of the heart and kidney. It is also famous for its significant role in creating the specialty of Endocrine surgery (the first international course on Endocrine Surgery was held here by Professors Selwyn Taylor and Richard Welbourn in 1971). Its services now include the Heart Attack Centre (Primary PCI Centre) for North West London, a leukaemia wing (The Catherine Lewis Centre) the Department of Thyroid and Endocrine Surgery (serving North West London and pan-UK referrals and hosting the Selwyn Taylor Fellow) and the West London Renal and Transplant Centre. The Medical Research Council (MRC) also has a major presence at Hammersmith Hospital through the London Institute of Medical Sciences providing a strong foundation for clinical and scientific research, with extensive research and development of imaging techniques.

See also
 List of hospitals in England

References

External links 

Imperial College Healthcare NHS Trust's official site
Aerial photo at Google Maps

Imperial College Healthcare NHS Trust
NHS hospitals in London
White City, London
Poor law infirmaries
Military hospitals in the United Kingdom